Matías Fernando Cóccaro Ferreira (born 15 November 1997) is a Uruguayan professional footballer who plays as a striker for Argentine Primera División club Huracán, on loan from Montevideo City Torque.

Career

In 2017, Cóccaro joined the youth academy of Italian Serie A side Cagliari.

As a youth player, he joined the youth academy of Atlético Tucumán in Argentina after almost signing for Belgian side Royal Excel Mouscron and trialing in Italy.

Before the 2019 season, he signed for Uruguayan second division club Villa Teresa from Rampla Juniors in the Uruguayan top flight.

References

External links
 
 Matías Cóccaro at PlaymakerStats.com

Living people
1997 births
Uruguayan footballers
Uruguayan expatriate footballers
Uruguayan people of Italian descent
People from Lavalleja Department
Association football forwards
Cagliari Calcio players
Atlético Tucumán footballers
Rampla Juniors players
Villa Teresa players
Montevideo City Torque players
Club Atlético Huracán footballers
Uruguayan Segunda División players
Uruguayan Primera División players
Argentine Primera División players
Uruguayan expatriate sportspeople in Argentina
Uruguayan expatriate sportspeople in Italy
Expatriate footballers in Argentina
Expatriate footballers in Italy